The Tribunal de Justiça do Estado do Rio Grande do Norte (Court of appeal of Rio Grande do Norte State or simply TJRN) is the maximum court of the Judicial power of the Rio Grande do Norte State, Brazil. Part of Brazilian Judicial Power, his headquarters is located in the capital Natal. Its history begins in 1892.

Jurisdiction 
The court is the judicial instance to sue appeals against decisions pronounced by the judges of the counties of the State. Its functions are defined in the State Constitution, in the chapter VI, starting by the article 70, besides other statements. The judicial review of laws contested in opposition to the State Constitution, the criminal procedures against authorities like judges and mayors are other examples of cases of jurisdiction of the Tribunal de Justiça.

Composition 

Nowadays, it has fifteen chief judges (desembargadores):
 Judite de Miranda Monte Nunes
 Caio Otávio Regalado de Alencar
 Amaury de Souza Moura Sobrinho
 Osvaldo Soares Cruz
 Rafael Godeiro Sobrinho
 Aderson Silvino
 Cláudio Santos
 Expedito Ferreira de Souza
 João Rebouças
 Vivaldo Otávio Pinheiro
 Saraiva Sobrinho
 Amilcar Maia
 Dilermando Mota
 Virgílio Fernandes
 Zeneide Bezerra

History 
The Court was born in the early republican regime, as consequence of the Law nº 12, of 9 June 1892, sanctioned by Governor Pedro Velho. The Superior Tribunal de Justiça as was named, had five desembargadores

See also
 Brazil federal courts
 Superior Tribunal de Justiça
 Supremo Tribunal Federal

References 

Judiciary of Brazil
Subnational supreme courts
1892 establishments in Brazil
Courts and tribunals established in 1892